Emiliano Storani (born 19 May 1993) is an Italian former professional footballer who played as a forward.

Career
Born in Macerata, Marche, Storani was a youth product of Marche club Tolentino. He was a player in Marche "Giovanissimi" Football League in 2006–07 season; In 2007–08 he was selected by Marche "Giovanissimi" representative team.

Parma
In 2009–10 season Storani was a member of Emilia club Parma. He participated in National "Allievi" League for the under-17 team. Instead of promotion to the reserve team, Storani was transferred to Serie D club Santegidiese in 2010. In 2011, he was signed by fellow fifth division club Sambenedettese.

On 4 July 2012 Storani was signed by a professional club Renate. The club also signed Adorni, Malivojević and Santurro from Parma. However Storani made 5 appearances only in 2012–13 Lega Pro Seconda Divisione. Storani also returned to Parma circa February 2013, for 2013 Torneo di Viareggio.

On 27 June 2013 Storani left Parma.

Ascoli Picchio
On 27 June 2013 Storani left for Marche team Ascoli in 5-year deal, which the team had relegated from Serie B, with Daniele Gragnoli moved to opposite direction. Both club retained 50% registration rights, as well as valued the 50% registration rights of both players for €1.6 million, which purely a financial trick in the eve of Ascoli's bankruptcy. Storani played twice for the club in the first half of 2013–14 Lega Pro Prima Divisione. In February 2014 the club was takeover by the only bid from Ascoli Picchio FC 1898 SpA.

On 20 June 2014 new Ascoli and Parma terminated most of the co-ownership deals between them, with Tamási also returned to Parma on 1 July. However, the co-ownership of Storani and Ronchi were renewed to June 2015, also the deadline day of co-ownership before its abolish. However, on 29 July 2014 he was released by Ascoli.

Amateur clubs
In August 2014 he was signed by Serie D club Civitanovese. in late October he was signed by Maceratese in temporary deal.  However, he was released again on 30 November. He immediately left for Grottammare of Eccellenza Marche.

Footnotes

References

External links
 
 AIC profile (data by football.it) 

Italian footballers
Parma Calcio 1913 players
A.S. Sambenedettese players
A.C. Renate players
Ascoli Calcio 1898 F.C. players
Serie C players
Association football forwards
People from Macerata
Sportspeople from the Province of Macerata
1993 births
Living people
Footballers from Marche